Firth of Tay is a sound or firth,  long and  wide, extending in a northwest–southeast direction between the northeast side of Dundee Island and the east portion of Joinville Island. It merges to the northwest with Active Sound with which it completes the separation of Dundee and Joinville Islands. It was discovered in 1892–93 by Captain Thomas Robertson of the Dundee whaling expedition and named by him after the Firth of Tay of Scotland.

See also
Active Reef
Tay Head

References 

Sounds of Graham Land
Landforms of the Joinville Island group